The M104 Wolverine "Heavy Assault Bridge" is United States armored vehicle-launched bridge  vehicle, designed to lay down a bridge in combat.

Background
Since the 1960s the United States Army has made use of armored bridge-laying vehicles based on the M48 Patton/M60 series of tanks. In recent years, however, the Army discovered that the aging M60 AVLB was too slow to keep up with the M1 Abrams main battle tanks' top speed of roughly 70 km/h during field maneuvers. Additionally, the Abrams was so heavy that it could safely cross the AVLB's bridge only at a very slow speed.

Program development for a new armored bridge-laying vehicle began in 1983, and by 1994 General Dynamics Land Systems and the German MAN Mobile Bridges GmbH (since 2005 Krauss-Maffei Wegmann) had been awarded a contract. The first prototype vehicles were being tested by 1996, and the first production models were delivered by 2003.

Description
Because the Wolverine is essentially an M1A2 SEP tank with Leguan bridge-laying gear instead of a turret, it shares virtually all of the parent vehicle's speed, mobility, survivability, and automotive components. This commonality was a key design factor in the Wolverine's development. The Wolverine also features an advanced communications package designed to keep it in contact with local field commanders. However, the vehicle itself is completely unarmed.

The Wolverine is operated by two crewmen who sit within the hull. Both crewmen have access to the bridging controls, while the bridge is carried in two sections, stacked above the hull. Once a bridging site is chosen the vehicle securely anchors itself in place with a spade. The two sections of the bridge are joined together, and then the entire bridge is extended across the obstacle and dropped into place. The crewmen have the ability to make minor corrections during launch, if needed. Once operations are complete, the Wolverine drives across the bridge and retrieves it from the other side simply by reversing the process. The bridge can be lowered in under five minutes or raised in less than ten minutes, all without the crewmen ever leaving the safety of their vehicle.

Once launched, the 26-meter Leguan bridge can support a 70-ton vehicle moving at 16 km/h, or 10 miles per hour. The Wolverine thus allows the heaviest of vehicles to cross craters, ditches, and damaged bridges at combat speed. This mobility is a decisive advantage for armored units.

Future plans and replacement
To date the United States Army has received 44 Wolverines, which have been distributed to a few select engineer units. The Army had originally intended to purchase 465 vehicles; however, budget cuts and a shift in philosophy toward a lighter fighting force meant that the Army no longer needed hundreds of bridgelaying vehicles. While the Army did not plan to purchase any more Wolverines, it had, at the time, reserved the right to restart production if necessary.  However, in 2016 the Wolverine's replacement  the Leonardo DRS Joint Assault Bridge (JAB), was chosen, thus effectively ending the Wolverine program.

The M1074 Joint Assault Bridge also has an Abrams tank chassis, but is combined with an  scissor bridge. While the M104 was intended to replace the AVLB, it was found to be too expensive and complicated to maintain and operate. While the JAB's bridge is shorter, it has a faster deployment time of three minutes, compared to the Wolverine's 3-5 minute set-up time. On August 23, 2016, DRS Technologies, Inc., announced that the U.S. Army had awarded it an indefinite quantity contract worth up to $400 million to build the new M1074 Joint Assault Bridge System(JABS). Low-rate production completed in mid-2018, initial series production began in 2019.

Users
The Leguan bridge laying gear is used by forces worldwide:

 : The Belgian Land Component of the Belgian Forces have a minor number of Leguan Systems on Leopard-1-chassis.
 : In 2019 Danish Defence Acquisition and Logistics Organization ordered 6 Leguan Systems on Leopard-2-chassis. Delivery is planned by end of 2022.
 : German Bundeswehr has six Leguan Systems and ordered 24 more, delivered until 2028.
 : Finland Armed Forces have 10 Leguan-Systems on Leopard-2-chassis and 9 Leguan Systems on Sisu E13TP-Trucks in service
 : Greek Armed Forces have 8 Leguan-Systems on Leopard-1-chassis in service.
 : South African Defence Forces have two Systems on Olifant-chasis.
 : Türk Kara Kuvvetleri have 36 Leguan on Leopard-1 in service.
 : US Army planned to buy 465 Systems for M104 Wolverine. To date, only 44 have been delivered.

See also
List of U.S. military vehicles by model number
Titan
AM 50 automatically launched assault bridge
M1074 Joint Assault Bridge
List of land vehicles of the U.S. Armed Forces

References

External links
 Image of M104 Wolverine

Armoured vehicle-launched bridges
Armored fighting vehicles of the United States
General Dynamics land vehicles
Military vehicles introduced in the 2000s